The Thornburgh Memo was a U.S. Department of Justice memorandum prepared by then Attorney General Richard Thornburgh, on June 8, 1989. The memo declared that state ethics rules were not binding upon federal prosecutors. It asserted that any compliance with state ethical rules by federal prosecutors conducting government investigations was strictly voluntary.

While the memo was not legally binding, it represented a dramatic statement of the then executive branch's understanding of its ethical obligations as lawyers.

When Janet Reno became Attorney General in 1993, the Justice Department backed away from the Thornburgh position. Instead, they promulgated the "Reno Rules," detailed in the Code of Federal Regulations.

An attorney for the Government shall be subject to State laws and rules, and local Federal court rules, governing attorneys in each State where such attorney engages in that attorney's duties, to the same extent and in the same manner as other attorneys in that State.

External sources
 Richard Thornburgh, Memorandum to All Justice Department Litigators Re Communications with Persons Represented by Counsel (unpublished office memorandum, June 8, 1989), in In re Doe, 801 F. Supp. 478, 489-93 (D.N.M. 1992).

Law of the United States
Memoranda